Hein-Direck Neu (13 February 1944 in Bad Kreuznach died 14 April 2017 in Wiesbaden) was a German discus thrower who competed in the 1968 Summer Olympics, in the 1972 Summer Olympics, and in the 1976 Summer Olympics.

References

1944 births
2017 deaths
People from Bad Kreuznach
German male discus throwers
West German male discus throwers
Olympic athletes of West Germany
Athletes (track and field) at the 1968 Summer Olympics
Athletes (track and field) at the 1972 Summer Olympics
Athletes (track and field) at the 1976 Summer Olympics
Universiade medalists in athletics (track and field)
Universiade silver medalists for West Germany
Medalists at the 1967 Summer Universiade
Medalists at the 1970 Summer Universiade
Sportspeople from Rhineland-Palatinate